Lorenzo Penna (born January 21, 1998) is an Italian professional basketball player for Pallacanestro Forlì of the Lega Serie A2.

References

External links
 Lorenzo Penna at legabasket.it 

1998 births
Living people
Andrea Costa Imola players
Italian men's basketball players
Sportspeople from the Metropolitan City of Bologna
Point guards
Virtus Bologna players